Kuraki (also Romanized as Kūrakī) is a village in Mahmeleh Rural District, Mahmeleh District, Khonj County, Fars Province, Iran. At the 2006 census, its population was 66, in 11 families.

References 

Populated places in Khonj County